Tang Dechao (born February 9, 1984) is a Chinese former football player. He represented Xiangxue Pharmaceutical, Sunray Cave, Guangzhou Evergrande, Henan Jianye and Meizhou Kejia throughout his playing career and was the first and only player to win all domestic trophies in China, including Chinese Super League, China League One, China League Two, Chinese FA Cup and Chinese FA Super Cup.

Club career
Tang Dechao started his football career playing for the Guangzhou F.C.'s youth team before being promoted to the club's satellite team Xiangxue Pharmaceutical who were allowed to play during the 2002-03 season in the Hong Kong First Division League. The following season he was allowed to stay in Hong Kong and played for Sunray Cave for a season before he returned to Guangzhou.

Tang played for Guangzhou Evergrande between 2005 and 2013.

He transferred to China League One side Henan Jianye in July 2013.

In July 2015, Tang transferred to China League Two side Meizhou Kejia. After helping Meizhou win 2015 League Two champions, he became first and only player to win all domestic trophies in China, including Super League, League One, League Two, Chinese FA Cup and Chinese FA Super Cup.

Career statistics 
Statistics accurate as of match played 31 December 2020.

Honours

Club
Guangzhou Evergrande
Chinese Super League: 2011, 2012
China League One: 2007, 2010
Chinese FA Cup: 2012
Chinese FA Super Cup: 2012

Henan Jianye
China League One: 2013

Meizhou Kejia
China League Two: 2015

References

External links
Player profile at sina.com

 

1984 births
Living people
Footballers from Guangzhou
Chinese footballers
Guangzhou F.C. players
Hong Kong First Division League players
Henan Songshan Longmen F.C. players
Meizhou Hakka F.C. players
Chinese Super League players
China League One players
China League Two players
Association football defenders